Crowfoot station is a CTrain light rail station in Calgary, Alberta, Canada adjacent to Scenic Acres and Arbour Lake. It opened on June 15, 2009 as part of a 4 km extension, on Route 201 and was the line's northern terminus until August 23, 2014.

The station is located in the median of Crowchild Trail, 13 km Northwest of the 7 Avenue & 9 Street SW interlocking, to the west of Nose Hill Drive. Designed with a 1345 stall Park and Ride lot and pedestrian overpasses that connect the station directly to both the Scenic Acres community, as well as provide a link to Crowfoot Centre. Inside the station building, two escalators, a set of stairs, and an elevator provide access down to the platform. The Crowfoot Station is unique in that the Western end of the platform wraps around the station building.

References

External links
Northwest Extension Construction - Specifications & Image Gallery Timeline

CTrain stations
Railway stations in Canada opened in 2009
2009 establishments in Alberta